Daniel Lee Kolb (born March 29, 1975) is a former Major League Baseball relief pitcher. Kolb has played for the Texas Rangers, Atlanta Braves, Milwaukee Brewers, and Pittsburgh Pirates. He bats and throws right-handed.

Career
He spent that season and the next three being shuttled between the Rangers and their minor league system. Released before the  season, he signed as a free agent with the Milwaukee Brewers, where he became the closer, converting 60 of 67 save opportunities in 2003 and 2004 and making the 2004 NL All-Star team.

Before the 2005 season, the Atlanta Braves returned closer John Smoltz to his original starter role to compensate for several losses in their pitching rotation. The Braves traded pitchers José Capellán and Alec Zumwalt to the Brewers for Kolb to replace Smoltz in the bullpen. However, Kolb endured a poor season with the Braves, going 3-8 with a 5.93 ERA while recording only 11 saves before being replaced in the closer role by Chris Reitsma. He admitted following the '05 season that the pressure of replacing a legend like Smoltz played a big part in his ineffectiveness.

At the 2005 Major League Baseball Winter Meetings, Kolb was traded back to Milwaukee in exchange for reliever Wes Obermueller. He signed a one-year, $2 million deal with the Brewers on January 4, 2006 to serve as a setup man to Derrick Turnbow. He finished the year with a 2-2 record and a 4.84 ERA in 53 games.

He declared free agency on November 1, 2006 and signed a minor league contract with the Pittsburgh Pirates on February 3, . On March 29, he was told he would not be added to the major league roster to start the season. On June 12, the Pirates recalled Kolb from Triple-A Indianapolis.

Kolb was designated for assignment and was released from the Pirates after he declined the option to go to the minor leagues.

Kolb signed a minor league contract with an invitation to Spring Training with the Boston Red Sox on January 22, 2008. He was released on April 26, 2008.

Kolb graduated from Walnut High School in Walnut, Illinois.

See also

References

External links

1975 births
Living people
Baseball players from Illinois
Major League Baseball pitchers
Texas Rangers players
Milwaukee Brewers players
Atlanta Braves players
Pittsburgh Pirates players
National League All-Stars
Gulf Coast Rangers players
Charleston RiverDogs players
Charlotte Rangers players
Tulsa Drillers players
Oklahoma RedHawks players
Indianapolis Indians players
Pawtucket Red Sox players
Illinois State Redbirds baseball players
People from Sterling, Illinois